Makamba is a city located in southern Burundi. It is the capital city of Makamba Province.

Populated places in Burundi